"What a Man My Man Is" is the name of a No. 1 U.S. country music hit by Lynn Anderson, from 1974.

This was Anderson's last No. 1 country hit, staying at the top for one week and spending a total of nine weeks on the chart. It was also her last pop entry on the Hot 100, reaching number 93. For the next few years, Anderson would place hits in the Country top 15 and 20, but wouldn't reach the top 10 again until 1979 with "Isn't it Always Love". The song has been re-recorded numerous times by Anderson, including on her Grammy-nominated 2004 album, The Bluegrass Sessions.

Chart performance

Cover Versions
Debbie Rule covered the song on her album Texas Girls (2015).

References

Lynn Anderson songs
1974 songs
1974 singles
Songs written by Glenn Sutton
Columbia Records singles
Song recordings produced by Glenn Sutton